Nomad (stylised nomad or NOMAD) are a New Zealand band, best known for their 2016 single "Oh My My", which peaked at #2 on the Top 20 NZ Singles Chart. After the song had 1.7 million streaming plays, they were nominated for Breakthrough Artist of the Year at the 2016 NZ Music Awards.

Discography

Studio album

Singles

References 

Musical groups established in 2015
Musical groups disestablished in 2020
Musical groups from Christchurch
New Zealand musical trios
New Zealand pop music groups
Smokefreerockquest national finalists
2015 establishments in New Zealand